Lyn is a surname. Notable people with the name include:

 Anthony Lyn (born 1965), Welsh theatrical director and actor
 Brian Lyn (born 1961), Antiguan cyclist
 David Lyn (1927-2012), Welsh actor and director 
 Dawn Lyn (born 1963), American child actress 
 Euros Lyn, Welsh director for television
 George Lyn, Jamaican politician
 Jacquie Lyn (1928–2002), British-born American child actress
 Keon Lyn (born 1992), American football player
 Lisa Lyn (born 1964), Canadian field hockey player
 Nicole Lyn (born 1978), Canadian television actress
 Robbie Lyn (born 1951), Jamaican musician

See also
Lyn (given name)
Lin (surname)
Lynn (surname)